Calliostoma normani is a species of sea snail, a marine gastropod mollusk in the family Calliostomatidae.

Description

Distribution
This species occurs in the Atlantic Ocean at bathyal depths off the Azores.

References

 Dautzenberg P. & Fischer H., 1897: Dragages effectués par l'Hirondelle et par la Princesse Alice 1888–1896. Gastropodes et Pélécypodes; Mémoires de la Société Zoologique de France, 10: 139–234; pl. 3-7
 Gofas, S.; Le Renard, J.; Bouchet, P. (2001). Mollusca, in: Costello, M.J. et al. (Ed.) (2001). European register of marine species: a check-list of the marine species in Europe and a bibliography of guides to their identification. Collection Patrimoines Naturels, 50: pp. 180–213

External links

normani
Gastropods described in 1897
Molluscs of the Atlantic Ocean